Joanna Cotten (born in Memphis, Tennessee) is an American country music singer. Cotten's debut single, "The Prize," peaked at number 60 on the Billboard Hot Country Songs chart. Cotten recorded 21 songs for an unreleased album for Warner Bros. Records. She split from the label in December 2007 after the release of a digital-only extended play. Cotten has continued to record and tour. From 2013 to 2022, she was a member of Eric Church's band, until she quit in July 2022.

Discography

Studio albums

Extended plays

Singles

References

External links

[ Joanna Cotten] on Allmusic

American women country singers
American country singer-songwriters
Living people
Musicians from Memphis, Tennessee
Warner Records artists
Singer-songwriters from Tennessee
Country musicians from Tennessee
Year of birth missing (living people)
21st-century American women